The Sixth Man or Sixth Man or 6th Man may refer to:
 The 6th Man, a 1997 American sports comedy film
The 6th Man (soundtrack)
 Sixth man, a substitute player in basketball
 Sixth man (fans), basketball fans attempting to influence the game 
 The Sixth Man (novel), a 2011 novel by David Baldacci
 The Sixth Man, the 16th episode of Law & Order season 15
 6th Man Apps, a software company founded by Anthony Fernandez